The 2014 National Club Baseball Association (NCBA) Division II Tournament was a post-season tournament for the best teams in the NCBA during the 2014 season. 30 NCBA Division II college baseball teams met after playing their way through the regular season to play in the NCBA Tournament. The tournament culminated with eight teams competing for the 2014 NCBA Division II World Series at Brooks Stadium in Paducah, KY.

Districts
The opening rounds of the tournament were played across eight pre-determined sites across the country, each consisting of a four-team field except for District VII, which consisted of a two-team best-of-three format. All other districts were double elimination. The winner of each district advances to the NCBA Division II World Series.

District I
at Rome, NY

Note: The district championship game between Monmouth and Brockport was moved to Endwell, NY due to weather.

District II
at State College, PA

District III
at Martinsville, VA

District IV
at Columbus, OH

District V
at Sheboygan, WI

District VI
at St. Louis, MO

District VII
at Houston, TX

District VIII
at Cedar City, UT

NCBA Division II World Series

References

2014 in baseball
National Club Baseball Association